Genoa Area Local School District is a school district in Northwest Ohio. The school district has an open enrollment policy which allows students who live outside the district's borders to attend; however, the school primarily serves students who live in the city and townships of Genoa, Allen Twp., and Clay Twp. located in Ottawa County. The superintendent is Mike Ferguson.

Grades 9-12
Genoa Area High School
Students who live in the village of Genoa attend the
school district, as well as students who live in the
towns of Clay Center, Curtice, Martin, and Williston.

Grades 6-8
John C. Robert Middle School

Grades K-5
Genoa Elementary School

External links
District Website

School districts in Ohio
Education in Ottawa County, Ohio